Carrboro High School is located in Carrboro, North Carolina, United States. It is located close to the University of North Carolina at Chapel Hill. Carrboro High school is part of the Chapel Hill-Carrboro City Schools district which contains two other high schools, Chapel Hill High School and East Chapel Hill High School. Its first year of operation was the 2007-2008 school year.  It is the smallest CHCCS high school with total enrollment being 895. The student body makeup is 51 percent male and 49 percent female, and the total minority enrollment is 42 percent. Beverly Rudolph is the principal, a position she has held since 2017.

Academics
Carrboro High School is ranked 10th in the 2016 US News rankings. The school posted the fourth highest average SAT score in the Raleigh-Durham area: 1750 with 89.3% of students taking the test. There is a high AP® participation rate at Carrboro High at 80 percent and 74 percent pass. Additionally, there is a 15:1 student-teacher ratio. It has higher than state average proficiency across the board.

Carrboro High School has a focus on international studies; all freshman students are part of the Academy of International Studies. They can continue the Academy of International Studies in 10th through 12th grade if they choose. Students in the academy will take several core classes with an international focus and have other specific requirements they must meet, for example, 20 international service hours. This also means several international focused electives are offered, to students both in the academy and not.

Athletics
Carrboro High School is a 3A high school in North Carolina. It offers the same varsity sports as Chapel Hill High School. Carrboro High School has access to a baseball field, a softball field, a track, a gymnasium, and two general practice fields. These two fields are used for football and soccer during the fall season.

Carrboro cross-country won the school's first trophy from its second-place finish in the Open race at the Tanglewood Invitational, held in Winston-Salem. Carrboro High's women's cross country team won the 2A state championship in 2009, 2010, 2011, 2012, and 2014 and the boys cross country team won the state championship in 2010. The women's track & field team won the 2A state championship in 2011, 2012, and 2013, and the women's soccer team won in 2012, 2015, and 2016.The Jags added their first 2A dual team men's tennis state championship in spring 2014. Max Fritsch and Jake Zinn also won the school's first individual tennis title, taking the 2014 2A doubles state championship. Both feats were repeated in 2015. Men's swimming won state champions in 2010, 2011, 2012, and 2015. Carrboro High School won the Wells Fargo Conference Cup every year since 2011 and the Wells Fargo Cup three times in 2011–2012, 2012–2013, and 2013–2014 school years for having the strongest 2A athletic program in the state.

Arts
Carrboro High was home to the Carrboro High School Jaguar Regiment. In 2011, the Jaguar Regiment finished the season undefeated in its class. While the marching band had fewer than 30 people in it, the Jaguar Regiment managed to net first in its class at the 34th Brick Capitol Classic marching competition in 2013.. While the marching band eventually grew too small and ended, many other arts programs have emerged. Carrboro High School is now home to three a cappella groups. Students also perform a fall play, an annual spring musical and several One Acts performances (which are all written, directed and performed by students).

Principals
Jeff Thomas, 2007–2008 
Kelly Batten, 2008–2012
LaVerne Mattocks, 2012–2017
Beverly Rudolph, 2017–present

References

Public high schools in North Carolina
Chapel Hill-Carrboro City Schools
Schools in Orange County, North Carolina